is a Japanese-exclusive video game with gambling/life sim elements, where players take control of their character and make money by betting on cycle races at the local Velodrome.

Cute anime-style graphics are employed throughout the game; stating that the premise of the game is less serious than other Super NES gambling style video games.

Gameplay

The game plays like a miniature version of a role-playing video game.

Before each race, players has the ability to buy supplies from a drug store, a 24-hour variety store, and a clothing store for a certain amount of yen per purchase. Interaction with non-player characters is possible while at the shopping district. Players can also gamble by placing wagers on other bicycle racing events, buying parimutuel tickets with the chance of winning a respectable sum. Acquiring a newspaper to pick up results from other races can be done within the downtown portion of the game.

There are nine competitors and five laps in a typical race. Every track that can be raced on using a bicycle is a velodrome with four superelevated turns that are typical in most velodromes. Riders are not always traveling at full speed or at a specific radius; making a balance between aggressive riding and passive riding a must. All information for particular races are viewable on an information bank that is included with the racing action. Players must choose between story and party modes that provide a different perspective of the bicycle racing lifestyle.

Reception
On release, Famicom Tsūshin scored the game a 23 out of 40.

See also
 Nakano Koichi Kanshuu: Keirin-Ou
 Sprinter Monogatari: Mezase!! Ikkaku Senkin
 Ippatsu Gyakuten: Keiba Keirin Kyōtei

References

1995 video games
Cycling video games
Japan-exclusive video games
Super Nintendo Entertainment System games
Super Nintendo Entertainment System-only games
Video games developed in Japan